Princethorpe College is a Catholic independent day school located in Princethorpe, near Rugby, Warwickshire, England. Princethorpe College opened in September 1966 after the Missionaries of the Sacred Heart (MSCs), purchased the site to use as the senior school for their already established boys’ school, St Bede’s College in Leamington Spa.

History
The college was founded by the Missionaries of the Sacred Heart and opened its doors in September 1966. Girls were first admitted into the sixth form in 1976. It became fully coeducational in 1995. It currently occupies the site of St Mary's Priory, which had been home to Benedictine nuns since 1792 before the house was disbanded in 2002.

In late 2007 a new £2.4 million dedicated Sixth Form Centre opened. Built around an atrium, the new building provides classrooms, a lecture room, common room, a Sixth Form dining room, coffee bar and a careers room and is linked to the main school building on two levels by a walkway.

In late 2014, a new £4.5 million teaching block named 'The Limes' was opened. This was built onto the side of the existing sports centre, and is linked on both floors. The Limes contains 2 new ICT rooms, new classrooms for Modern Foreign Languages, English & Sports Theory, and staff bases for English, Modern Foreign Languages, ICT and PE. It also contains 200+ lockers for pupils. Work was completed in September 2017 on the refurbishment of the College's state-of-the-art Clarkson Theatre.

Extracurricular activities
The college offers a wide range of clubs, societies and activities that take place at lunch-time and after school. Art, badminton, chess, computing, dance, drama, equestrian, photography and technology are usually offered, including the Duke of Edinburgh Award Scheme and overseas trips. There is a chapel on site which is available for students to worship in.

Sport
Pupils participate in games from Year 7 to Upper Sixth, with PE being optional after Year 9. All the major traditional sports are offered, in addition to other sports such as archery, golf, basketball, rock-climbing, equestrian and skiing competitions. 

There is a programme of inter-school fixtures and Princethorpe has a tradition of pupils gaining county, regional and international representative honours, not least Old Princethorpian Ian Bell of cricketing fame. Sports facilities include a Sports Hall, a Fitness Centre and squash courts, a floodlit astro-turf pitch, a regionally recognised cross-country course, three concrete tennis courts and over sixty acres of games pitches and fields.

Notable alumni
Ian Bell, MBE, England cricketer
Jordan King, Formula One Development Driver
Dominic Ostler, retired Warwickshire county cricketer
Tom Hilditch, award-winning journalist and magazine publisher
Mark Lewis, cricketer
Richard Wilding, British Academic & Business Professional
Aaron Pressley, footballer

References

External links

School Website
Profile on the ISC website

Private schools in Warwickshire
Roman Catholic private schools in the Archdiocese of Birmingham
Schools in Rugby, Warwickshire
Member schools of the Headmasters' and Headmistresses' Conference
 
Educational institutions established in 1966
1966 establishments in England